Cupidoliva is a genus of sea snails, marine gastropod mollusks in the family Olividae.

Species
Species within the genus Cupidoliva include:

 Cupidoliva adiorygma (Verco, 1909)
 Cupidoliva nympha (A. Adams & Angas, 1864)
 Cupidoliva solidula (Verco, 1909)

References

External links

Olivellinae